Roman Mykhailovych Svintsitskyi (born 28 February 1981 in Lviv) is a former Ukrainian professional footballer.

External links
 
 
 

1981 births
Living people
Ukrainian footballers
Association football midfielders
Ukrainian expatriate footballers
Expatriate footballers in Belarus
FC Halychyna Drohobych players
FC Ihroservice Simferopol players
FC Dynamo Brest players
FC Spartak Ivano-Frankivsk players
FC Kalush players
FC Krymteplytsia Molodizhne players
FC Obolon-Brovar Kyiv players
FC Feniks-Illichovets Kalinine players
FC Prykarpattia Ivano-Frankivsk (2004) players
Sportspeople from Lviv